is a 2011 Japanese film directed by Kōichi Gotō.

Cast
 Takako Uehara 
 Kensei Mikami

Production
The film was shot in Misasa, Tottori.

References

External links
  
 

2011 films
2011 drama films
Tōhaku District, Tottori
Films directed by Kōichi Gotō
Films set in Tottori Prefecture
Japanese drama films
2010s Japanese films